Grazac may refer to:

 Grazac, Haute-Garonne, in the Haute-Garonne department
 Grazac, Haute-Loire, in the Haute-Loire department
 Grazac, Tarn, in the Tarn department